The marbled pearlfish (Leptolebias marmoratus) is a species of killifish in the family Rivulidae. This threatened species is found in temporary channels within dense Atlantic rainforest, in the floodplains of rivers draining into the Baía de Guanabara, near the city of Rio de Janeiro in southeastern Brazil.

This species may be the only member of its genus, the inclusion of several others made Leptolebias paraphyletic, according to some workers. To avoid this, some authorities moved the other species to Leptopanchax, Mucurilebias and Notholebias.

References

Marbled pearlfish
Endemic fauna of Brazil
Fauna of Brazil
Taxa named by Werner Ladiges
Taxonomy articles created by Polbot
Fish described in 1934